India competed in the 2021 Asian Youth Para Games which was held in Manama, Bahrain from 2 to 6 December 2021. The Indian contingent competed in four sports.

Medalists 

Source:

References

Asian Youth Para Games